Bulletin of the Geological Society of Finland is a peer-reviewed open access scholarly journal publishing research articles and short communications in all branches of geosciences. It the official journal of the Geological Society of Finland. The current editor-in-chief is Dr. Niina Kuosmanen. From 1929 to 1967 (Volumes 1 to 39), it was known as Comptes Rendus de la Société Géologique de Finlande before changing to the current name from Volume 40 onwards to the present day.

Abstracting and indexing 
The journal is abstracted and indexed in:

References

External links 
 

Publications established in 1929
Open access journals
English-language journals
Geology journals